James Brunton Stephens (17 June 1835 – 29 June 1902) was a Scottish-born Australian poet, and author of Convict Once.

Early life

Stephens was born in Bo'ness, on the Firth of Forth, Scotland; the son of John Stephens, the parish schoolmaster, and his wife Jane, née Brunton. J. B. Stephens was educated at his father's school, then at a free boarding school and at the University of Edinburgh from 1849 to 1854 without obtaining a degree. For three years he was a travelling tutor on the continent, and from 1859 became a school teacher in Scotland. While teaching at Greenock Academy, Stephens wrote some minor verse and two short novels ('Rutson Morley' and 'Virtue Le Moyne') which were published in Sharpe's London Magazine in 1861–63.

Career in Australia

Stephens migrated to Queensland in 1866, possibly for health reasons. He was a tutor with the Barker family of squatters at Tamrookum station for some time and in 1870 entered the Queensland Education Department. He had experience as a teacher at Stanthorpe and was afterwards in charge of the school at Ashgrove, near Brisbane. Representations were then made to the premier, Sir Thomas McIlwraith, that a man of Stephens's ability was being wasted in a small school, and in 1883 a position was found for him as a correspondence clerk in the colonial secretary's department. He afterwards rose to be undersecretary to the chief secretary's department.

Before coming to Australia Stephens had done a little writing for popular magazines, and in 1871 his first volume of poems, Convict Once, was published by Macmillan and Company, which immediately proclaimed him to be an Australian poet of importance. In 1873, a long poem, The Godolphin Arabian, was published. These were followed by The Black Gin and other Poems, 1873, and Miscellaneous Poems, 1880. The first collected edition of his poems was published in 1885, others followed in 1888, 1902 and 1912. Of these, the 1902 edition is the most complete. After Stephens entered the colonial secretary's department in 1883 he was unable (or did not have the financial pressure) to do much literary work though he wrote occasionally for the press.

Poetic critique

Stephens was a man of medium height "with the face of a poet". Simple and natural in manner, he was modest about his own work. His over-sensitiveness to the sufferings of others made it difficult for him to resist appeals for charity to the extent of damaging his own fortunes. He was sometimes exuberant and full of humour, though occasionally the pendulum swung the other way. His sense of duty kept him working during his last illness.

No doubt Stephens's official papers exercised his literary talent, but from a creative standpoint his employment in the civil service was perhaps not the best use of his time, and he wrote little verse in later years. However, though new men were arising, he remained the representative man of letters in Australia until his death. His humorous output is, at its best, very good. Despite all changes of fashion, such Stephens poems as "The Power of Science" and "My other Chinese Cook" can still evoke laughter.

The Godolphin Arabian in the metre and style of Byron's Beppo goes on its pleasant rhyming way for about three thousand lines and is still readable, but as it is not included in any collected edition, it has been almost wholly forgotten. Convict Once remains one of the few long Australian poems of merit, and in a technical sense it constitutes a lesson to those writers who mistakenly think that writing in a long metre is easy. Much of Stephens's other verse is admirable in its simplicity and dignity.

His poems on federation – "The Dominion of Australia" and "The Dominion" – are among his most notable productions.  At least eighteen of his published poems have unmistakably Australian themes and settings: "Fulfilment", "Cape Byron", "A Coin of Trajan in Australia", "A Lost Chance", "Adelaide Ironside", "Australian Anthem", "Opening Hymn", "Drought and Doctrine", "Marsupial Bill", "A Piccaninny", "To a Black Gin", "New Chum and Old Monarch", "The Great Pig Story of the Tweed", "A Son of the Soil", "Big Ben", "The Southern Cross", "A Brisbane Reverie" and "Convict Once".

"The Dominion" was quoted in Sir Henry Parkes' 'Tenterfield Oration', an 1889 speech calling for the federation of Australia.

Apart from his poetry, he published a short novel, A Hundred Pounds and the libretto of an opera. A few poetry pamphlets not already mentioned are listed in Percival Serle's Bibliography of Australasian Poetry and Verse.

Later life 

On 10 November 1876, Stephens had married Rosalie Mary Donaldson (1846–1932), and they had five children, Jessie Mary (1877–1945), Mary (1879–1961), Hubert (1881–), Rachael Catherine (1883–1967), and Georgina (1886–1961).  

In September 1878, Stephens became a founding member and an early president of the famed literary Johnsonian Club, Brisbane; 'an institution being the association of pressmen, artists, actors, and scientists'. 

He was suffering for some time from angina pectoris before his death on 29 June 1902. His funeral was held the next day and proceeded from Wyuna, his residence on Water Street at Highgate Hill, to the South Brisbane Cemetery.  Stephens was buried in the same joint plot as his parents-in-law, Thomas Willet Donaldson (c. 1810–1875) and Barbara Donaldson (c. 1814–1898), and survived by his wife, four daughters, and one son.  His wife, and three daughters (Jessie, Mary and Georgina) were later interred in the family plot.

Bibliography

Novel

 A Hundred Pounds: A Novelette (1876)

Poetry collections

 The Black Gin and Other Poems (1873)
 Miscellaneous Poems (1880)
 Convict Once and Other Poems (1885)
 The Poetical Works of Brunton Stephens (1902)
 My Chinee Cook and Other Humorous Verses (1902)

References

External links

1832 births
1902 deaths
Australian people of Scottish descent
Scottish poets
People from Bo'ness
19th-century poets
19th-century Australian poets
Burials in South Brisbane Cemetery
19th-century Australian public servants